Primeira Idade is an independent Portuguese film production company based in Lisbon.

Awards
It has produced the feature-length hybrid documentary The Metamorphosis of Birds, directed by Catarina Vasconcelos which was world premiered at the 70th Berlin International Film Festival in February 2020, at the Encounters Section, where it was awarded the FIPRESCI Award for Best Film at the Encounters Section.

Films
  Ruby a fiction short film, directed by Mariana Gaivão, winner of the Best Director Award at the Curtas Vila do Conde Festival in 2019, and screened at the International Film Festival Rotterdam in January 2020. 

 Look No Further, directed by André Marques. 

 Bad Bunny, directed by Carlos Conceição, world premiered at the 70th Cannes Film Festival's Critics' Week, in May 2017.

International Co-production
Primeira Idade has also co-produced internationally titles such as Snakeskin, directed by Singaporean Daniel Hui, highlighted with the Special Jury Award of the Torino Film Festival in November 2014, as well as the Award of Excellency for the New Asian Currents section of the Yamagata Documentary Film Festival, and a Special Jury Mention at the Montreal International Documentary Festival.

Filmography
 2020 - The Metamorphosis of Birds, directed by Catarina Vasconcelos
 2019 - Ghosts: Long Way Home, directed by Tiago Siopa
 2019 - Bird's Nest, directed by Miguel de Jesus
 2019 - Ruby, directed by Mariana Gaivão
 2019 - Look No Further, directed by André Marques, in co-production with Offshore Films in France
 2016 - Bad Bunny, directed by Carlos Conceição, in co-production with Epicentre Films in France
 2015 - Wake Up, Leviathan, directed by Carlos Conceição, in co-production with Mirabilis Produções in Angola
 2014 - Snakeskin, directed by Daniel Hui, in co-production with 13 Little Pictures in Singapore

References

External links 
 Cineuropa's article on Primeira Idade
 oficial webpage of Primeira Idade
 Primeira Idade at IMDb

Film production companies of Portugal
2014 establishments in Portugal
Portuguese companies established in 2014